Kyle Pierce is an American politician serving as a member of the Indiana House of Representatives from the 36th district. He assumed office on November 22, 2022.

Career 
Pierce earned a bachelor's degree from Ball State University in political science and a Juris Doctor from Indiana University. Pierce defeated Terri Austin, who was seeking her eleventh term, in the 2022 Indiana House of Representatives election.

Electoral history

References 

Indiana politicians
Living people

Year of birth missing (living people)